Shabnam Mustari is a Bangladeshi Nazrul Geeti singer. She was awarded Ekushey Padak in 1997 and Nazrul Award in 2014 by the Government of Bangladesh. Her notable songs include `"Laili Tomar Esheche Phiria"`, `"Amai Nohe Go Bhalobasho Mor Gaan"`, `"Piya Piya Piya"`, and `"Tumi Shuniye Cheyona"`.

Background
Mustari was born in Naogaon District to poet Talim Hossain and  journalist Begum Mafruha Chowdhury. Her sisters Yasmin Mustari and Parveen Mustari are also Nazrul Geeti singers.

Mustari music career started in the 1960s. She taught young artists under "Poet Talim Hossain Trust".

Mustari was diagnosed with dementia in 2019.

References

Living people
20th-century Bangladeshi women singers
20th-century Bangladeshi singers
Recipients of the Ekushey Padak in arts
Year of birth missing (living people)